Rock 'N' Roll on the New Long March is a 1989 album by Cui Jian, the so-called "Father of Chinese Rock". It is technically his second album as an album called Return of the Prodigal was released in 1984 in Hong Kong and Taiwan only, but he considers it his first and does not acknowledge the previous one. It is Cui's most successful album, and is considered China's first rock album. It also features "Nothing to My Name", the song that made Cui famous and which is considered to mark the beginning of rock music in China. Cui made the album in cooperation with the band ADO, and it was the only album he released while he was still with them.

Versions
An almost identical album called Nothing to My Name was released in Hong Kong and Taiwan the same year; it did not include the song "Rock 'N' Roll on the New Long March". In 1999 a second edition of the album was released, by Beijing-based Jingwen Records, to mark its tenth anniversary.

Reception
In a review published in China Information, Woei Lin Chong considers it Cui's "most impressive recording". This album, along with the success already enjoyed by "Nothing to My Name", established Cui as a symbol of the "angry youth" movement in China.

Track listing

Personnel

 Cui Jian – lead vocals, rhythm guitar

ADO 

 Eddie Randriamampionona (艾迪) – lead guitar
 Kassai Balazs (巴拉什) – bass
 Zhang Yongguang (张永光) – drums
 Liu Yuan (刘元) – saxophone, suona, flute

Additional musicians 

 Liu Xiaosong (刘效松) –  percussion
 Zhuang Biao (庄飚) – keyboards
 Wang Yong (王勇) – guzheng

References

1989 albums
Mandarin-language albums
Cui Jian albums